James Nicholas Tinnin Jr. is an American politician and a former Republican member of the New Mexico House of Representatives.

Early life and education

New Mexico House of Representatives
Tinnin was elected to the New Mexico House of Representatives in 2000 after defeating incumbent Jerry Sandel. He won re-election in 2002 and resigned in May 2003. Tinnin was replaced by former State Representative Dick Cheney, who previously represented the 2nd district from 1985 to 1995.

Electoral history

References

Place of birth missing (living people)
Living people
Republican Party members of the New Mexico House of Representatives
Year of birth missing (living people)